The Gentleman Rider is a 1919 British silent sports drama film directed by Walter West and starring Violet Hopson, Stewart Rome and Gregory Scott.

Cast
 Violet Hopson as Marjorie Denton
 Stewart Rome as Frank Cunningham
 Gregory Scott as Sir Reginald Buckley
 Cameron Carr as Billbrook
 Violet Elliott as Aunt Cynthia

References

Bibliography
 Palmer, Scott. British Film Actors' Credits, 1895-1987. McFarland, 1998.

External links
 

1919 films
1910s sports drama films
British horse racing films
British sports drama films
British silent feature films
Films directed by Walter West
British black-and-white films
1919 drama films
1910s English-language films
1910s British films
Silent sports drama films